Richard Webster may refer to:

 Richard Webster, 1st Viscount Alverstone (1842–1915), British barrister, politician and judge
 Richard Webster (rugby) (born 1967), Welsh dual-code international rugby footballer
 Richard Webster (British author) (1950–2011), British author, critic of Sigmund Freud
 Richard Webster (New Zealand author) (born 1946), New Zealand author, ghostwriter and entertainer
 Richard M. Webster (1922–1990), American politician from Missouri
 Richard Webster (athlete) (1914–2009), British Army officer and Olympic pole vaulter